The 2017 African Handball Cup Winners' Cup was the 23rd edition, organized by the African Handball Confederation, under the auspices of the International Handball Federation, the handball sport governing body. The tournament was held from April 13–22, 2017 and took place at the Salle Omnisport Al Inbiâat, in Agadir, Morocco, contested by 10 teams and won by Al Ahly SC of Egypt.

Draw

Preliminary rounds

Times given below are in WEST UTC+1.

Group A

* Note:  Advance to quarter-finals Relegated to 9th classification

Group B

* Note:  Advance to quarter-finals Relegated to 9th classification

Knockout stage
Championship bracket

5-8th bracket

9th place

Final standings

Awards

See also 
2017 African Handball Champions League

References

External links 
 CAHB official website

African Handball Cup Winners' Cup
2017 in African handball
2017 in Moroccan sport
International handball competitions hosted by Morocco